NewJourney is the eighteenth studio album by Japanese pop band Deen. It was released on 3 March 2019 under the Epic Records Japan label. It's their album for the first time in 1 year and 5 months. From this album, only Yamane and Ikemori are the main members of the band. The theme of the album is "Tabi" (Journey).

This album was released in three formats: regular CD edition and limited A/B CD+DVD edition. The limited A edition includes full BD footage of their live performance Deen Live Joy Break21: Best Songs 25years. The limited B edition includes DVD with two music video clips of the Mirai Kara no Hikari and the opening footage from the game itself.

Promotion

Singles
This album consist of four previously released singles.

Digital single "Aloha" was released on 14 July 2018, as the part of three weeks of consecutive digital single release. It was released several months after former member Tagawa left the band. 

The next two following digital singles with subtitles Jawaiian Style are self cover versions of their 1990s-2000s hit songs, Hitomi Sorasanaide and Power of Love.

The only single released in 2019, Mirai Kara no Hikari was promoted as an theme song to the RPG game "Tales of the Rays". It officially become their third single, which was provided to the game series Tales of.

Commercial performance
The album reached #22 in its first week and charted for 2 weeks.

Track listing

References

Sony Music albums
Japanese-language albums
2019 albums
Deen (band) albums